Ivan Vujica ( (born 20 April 1997) is an Australian footballer who plays as a left back for Macarthur. He has represented Croatia at youth level, being capped once for their under-19 side, and has represented Australia at youth level, being capped for their under-23 side.

Club career

Move to Croatia
Vujica departed Australia in 2011 to pursue a football career in Croatia, initially with NK Sesvete, before moving to GNK Dinamo Zagreb farm-side NK Lokomotiva Zagreb. In 2013, Vujica moved to Dinamo Zagreb.

Return to Australia
On 4 July 2016, Vujica signed a two-year contract with Newcastle Jets. Vujica made his professional debut in the first round of the 2016–17 A-League, coming on as a substitute for Daniel Mullen in a 1–1 draw with Adelaide United. He went on to make 10 starts that season but struggled to make the left back spot his own in the starting 11, He finished his first season in professional football with a combined total of 865 minutes.

2017–18
Vujica had a strong pre-season, catching the eye of new coach Ernie Merrick along the way. In Round 1 of that season against the Central Coast Mariners Vujica just edged past seasoned veteran Jason Hoffman for the starting left back spot. Following strong performances in the first three rounds, he signed a new two-year deal on 29 October 2017. As the season progressed Vujica emerged as one of Newcastle's biggest talents for the future.

Western United
On 23 June 2019, Vujica signed a two-year deal with new A-League club Western United following mutually terminating his contract with Newcastle Jets in the search for more game time.

International career
Vujica was called up to the Croatia Under-19 side for a UEFA European Under-19 Championship qualifier against Kazakhstan. He participated in a narrow 1–0 victory.

Honours
Macarthur
Australia Cup: 2022

References

External links
 

1997 births
Living people
Soccer players from Sydney
Australian people of Croatian descent
Association football fullbacks
Croatian footballers
Croatia youth international footballers
Australian soccer players
Australia under-23 international soccer players
Newcastle Jets FC players
Western United FC players
Macarthur FC players
A-League Men players